Mabe, Perranarworthal and St Gluvias was an electoral division of Cornwall in the United Kingdom which returned one member to sit on Cornwall Council between 2013 and 2021. It was abolished at the 2021 local elections, being succeeded by Mylor, Perranarworthal and Ponsanooth and Constantine, Mabe and Mawnan.

Councillors

Extent
Mabe, Perranarworthal and St Gluvias represented the villages of Perranarworthal, Ponsanooth, St Gluvias and Mabe as well as the hamlets of Church Town, Trenoweth, Antron and Burnthouse. The division also covered part of Tremough, a university campus of the University of Exeter and Falmouth University. The division covered 2644 hectares in total.

Election results

2017 election

2014 by-election

2013 election

References

Electoral divisions of Cornwall Council